Up Front is a 1951 American comedy film directed by Alexander Hall and starring Tom Ewell and David Wayne very loosely based on Bill Mauldin's World War II characters Willie and Joe. Mauldin repudiated it and refused his advising fee; he claimed never to have seen it. It takes place during the Italian Campaign of World War II.

Plot

Cast

David Wayne as Joe  
Tom Ewell as Willie   
Marina Berti as Emi Rosso   
Jeffrey Lynn as Capt. Ralph Johnson 
Richard Egan as Capa   
 Maurice Cavell as Vuaglio  
Vaughn Taylor as MP Maj. Lester   
 Silvio Minciotti as Poppa Rosso   
Paul Harvey as Col. Akeley   
 Roger De Koven as Sabatelli   
 Grazia Narciso as Signora Carvadossi   
 Tito Vuolo as  Tarantino   
Mickey Knox as Driver
 Hal Baylor as 	Smitty 
 John Doucette as Walsh 
 William Frambes as 	Rogers 
 Henry Rowland as	Krausmeyer
 Kenneth Tobey as 	Cooper 
 Arthur Space as 	Col. Hayes
 James Seay as 	Lt. Ferguson
 Harlan Warde as 	Lt. Myers 
 Selmer Jackson as General 
 Eugene Borden as 	French Captain
 Vito Scotti as Sergeant Clerk 
 John McGuire as	Military Police Lieutenant
 James Flavin as 	Military Policeman
 Peter Graves as 	Military Policeman
 Ann Tyrrell as Nurse 
 Midge Ware as 	Nurse 
 Gino Corrado as 	Waiter 
 Lucille Barkley as Nurse Receptionist
 Pat Carroll as Italian Girl

References

External links

1951 films
1951 comedy films
American black-and-white films
American comedy films
Films based on American comics
Films directed by Alexander Hall
Italian Campaign of World War II films
Military humor in film
Universal Pictures films
1950s English-language films
1950s American films